Wilson Reis Monte Alto Gonçalves (born January 6, 1985, in Januária) is a Brazilian mixed martial artist who competes in the Flyweight division. Reis is the former EliteXC Bantamweight Champion and has also competed for UFC, Bellator, ShoXC and Cage Warriors. Reis also appeared as an assistant Jiu-Jitsu coach in Dominick Cruz's team on The Ultimate Fighter: Live.

Background
Reis received his black belt in Brazilian jiu-jitsu from instructor Roberto Godoi. As a brown belt he won the 2004 Jiu Jitsu World Championships. Reis was crowned the first and only EliteXC Bantamweight champion on September 26, 2008. He trains at BJJ United in Pennsylvania and at Daddis Fight Camps in New Jersey and Philadelphia. He previously taught Brazilian jiu-jitsu and No-gi at Tri-State Martial Arts Academy in Levittown, Pennsylvania. Reis formerly competed in Bellator Fighting Championships. He competed for the first time in his native Brazil in WFE 11 - Platinum, winning by submission.

Mixed martial arts career

EliteXC
Reis debuted for the EliteXC promotion on their ShoXC series in January 2008.  He later appeared on their main cards at EliteXC: Primetime and EliteXC: Unfinished Business.

In September 2008, Reis defeated Abel Cullum to win the vacant EliteXC Bantamweight Championship.

Bellator Fighting Championships
In January 2009, it was announced that Reis reached an exclusive agreement with Bellator Fighting Championships.
Wilson Reis defeated Henry Martinez on April 10, 2009, at Bellator 2 in the first round of the Featherweight Tournament. He experienced his first loss against Joe Soto in the semi-finals at Bellator 6.

Reis was scheduled to make his Japanese debut for World Victory Road at Sengoku 12 on March 7, 2010.  However, Reis withdrew from the show in order to compete in season 2 of the Bellator Fighting Championships.

Reis was victorious in the first round of the Bellator featherweight tournament, defeating Shad Lierley via submission in the third round, after dominating the entire fight with this superior ground game.  He advanced to the semi-finals to face Patricio Freire who held a 13–0 record. Reis lost via unanimous decision, his second career loss.

Reis faced Deividas Taurosevičius on October 21, 2010, at Bellator 33.  He won the fight via split decision.

Reis then competed in the Bellator Season Four Featherweight tournament and won his quarterfinal fight against Zac George at Bellator 37 by submission in the first round.

Reis then had a rematch with Patricio Freire in the semifinals at Bellator 41, but lost via KO in the third round.

Reis dropped down to Bantamweight and competed in the Bellator Season Five Bantamweight tournament. In the quarterfinals, he faced Eduardo Dantas at Bellator 51, losing by second-round KO (flying knee and punches).

Post-Bellator
After losing two consecutive fights in a row, Reis has been released from the Bellator promotion along with Dan Hornbuckle.

Reis then competed in Win Fight & Entertainment (WFE), appearing for the first time in his native Brazil in WFE 11 - Platinum in December 2011.  He defeated Bruno "Demente" Menezes by rear naked choke.

On December 8, 2012, Reis fought for Europe's top organization Cage Warriors and defeated Owen Roddy by third-round submission in one of the fights of the year in Glasgow, Scotland.

Ultimate Fighting Championship
In August 2013, it was announced that Reis had signed with the UFC.  Reis was expected to face Hugo Viana at UFC Fight Night 28 on September 4, 2013. However, just days before the event Viana was forced out of the bout with an injury, removing their fight from the card altogether.

A few days after that announcement, Reis was again sought as a replacement. He stepped in to face Ivan Menjivar on September 21, 2013, at UFC 165, replacing Norifumi Yamamoto. Reis was successful in his debut, winning via unanimous decision.

Reis faced Iuri Alcântara on February 15, 2014, at UFC Fight Night 36. He lost the fight via split decision.

Reis was briefly linked to a bout with Pedro Munhoz on May 31, 2014, at The Ultimate Fighter Brazil 3 Finale.  However, the bout never materialized as Reis was replaced by promotional newcomer Matt Hobar.

For his next fight, Reis moved down to the flyweight division.  He was expected to face Tim Elliott on August 23, 2014, at UFC Fight Night 49.  However, Elliott pulled out of the bout in the days leading up to the event.  Reis instead faced promotional newcomer Joby Sanchez. He won the fight by unanimous decision.

Reis next faced Scott Jorgensen on October 25, 2014, at UFC 179. He won the fight by submission in the first round. Reis hurt Jorgensen with a body kick and backed up in pain, then immediately after shot in and successfully got the takedown on Jorgensen and passed to mount where he secured to an arm-triangle choke where Jorgensen was forced to tap.

Reis faced Jussier Formiga on May 30, 2015, at UFC Fight Night 67. He lost the back-and-forth fight by unanimous decision.

Reis faced Dustin Ortiz on January 30, 2015, at UFC on Fox 18. He won the fight by unanimous decision.

Reis was expected to face current Flyweight Champion Demetrious Johnson on July 30, 2016, at UFC 201. However, on July 8, it was announced that Johnson pulled out due to an undisclosed injury and the bout was postponed. Reis remained on the card against promotional newcomer Hector Sandoval. He won the fight via submission in the first round.

Reis faced Ulka Sasaki on February 11, 2017, at UFC 208. He won the fight by unanimous decision.

UFC Flyweight Title Challenge

Reis faced Flyweight champion Demetrious Johnson on April 15, 2017 at UFC on Fox 24. After a one-sided affair through the first two rounds, Reis suffered his first loss by submission as Johnson won via armbar in the third round.

Post title shot

Reis faced Henry Cejudo on September 9, 2017 at UFC 215 He lost the fight via TKO in the second round.

Reis faced John Moraga on April 14, 2018 at UFC on Fox 29. He lost the fight via unanimous decision.

Reis faced Ben Nguyen on December 2, 2018 at UFC Fight Night 142. He won the fight via unanimous decision.

As the last fight of his prevailing contract, Reis faced Alexandre Pantoja on April 13, 2019 at UFC 236. He lost the fight via TKO in the first round. Subsequently, UFC opted not to renew Reis' contract.

Post-UFC career
On February 18, 2020, news surfaced that Reis signed a contract with ARES FC.

As the first bout after his release from the UFC, Reis faced Carlos Briseño at Budo Sento Championship 1 on November 14, 2020. He won the fight via second round submission.

Reis was knocked out in 16 seconds in a bout with Donny Matos at the Budo Sento Championship 2 in Mexico on April 10, 2021.

Reis was then scheduled to face Johnny Campbell at Cage Warriors 126 on August 1, 2021. However, Reis withdrew from the bout due to an injury.

He made his promotional debut at Ares FC 2 against Taylor Lapilus on December 12, 2021. He lost the bout via unanimous decision.

Reis faced Jeremiah Labiano on March 4, 2022 at Cage Warriors 133. He won the bout via split decision.

Reis faced Tuomas Gronvall on December 31, 2022 at Cage Warriors 148, winning the bout via unanimous decision.

Reis faced Johnny Campbell on March 3, 2023 at Cage Warriors 148, winning the bout via rear-naked choke in the third round.

Grappling career
Wilson Reis is a Brazilian jiu-jitsu black belt under Roberto Godoi.

In 2004, Reis won the Brazilian jiu-jitsu World Championships as a Brown Belt.

Championships and accomplishments
EliteXC
EliteXC Bantamweight Championship (One time, First, Last)
Win Fight Entertainment
WFE Bantamweight Championship (One time)

Mixed martial arts record

|-
|Win
|align=center|27–12
|Johnny Campbell
|Submission (rear-naked choke)
|Cage Warriors 149
|
|align=center|3
|align=center|2:20
|San Diego, California, United States
|-
|Win
|align=center|26–12
|Tuomas Gronvall
|Decision (unanimous)
|Cage Warriors 148
|
|align=center|3
|align=center|5:00
|London, England
|
|-
|Win
|align=center|25–12
|Jeremiah Labiano
|Decision (split)
|Cage Warriors 133
|
|align=center|3
|align=center|5:00
|San Diego, California, United States
|
|-
|Loss
|align=center|24–12
|Taylor Lapilus
|Decision (unanimous)
|Ares FC 2
|
|align=center|3
|align=center|5:00
|Paris, France
|
|-
|Loss
|align=center|24–11
|Donny Matos
|KO (punch)
|Budo Sento Championship 2
|
|align=center|1
|align=center|0:16
|Mexico City, Mexico
|
|-
|Win
|align=center|24–10
|Carlos Briseño
|Submission (arm-triangle choke)
|Budo Sento Championship 
|
|align=center|2
|align=center|4:38
|Mexico City, Mexico
|
|-
|Loss
|align=center|23–10
|Alexandre Pantoja
|TKO (punches)
|UFC 236 
|
|align=center|1
|align=center|2:58
|Atlanta, Georgia, United States
|
|-
|Win
|align=center|23–9
|Ben Nguyen
|Decision (unanimous)
|UFC Fight Night: dos Santos vs. Tuivasa 
|
|align=center|3
|align=center|5:00
|Adelaide, Australia
|
|-
|Loss
|align=center|22–9
|John Moraga
|Decision (unanimous)
|UFC on Fox: Poirier vs. Gaethje
|
|align=center|3
|align=center|5:00
|Glendale, Arizona, United States
|
|-
|Loss
|align=center|22–8
|Henry Cejudo
|TKO (punches)
|UFC 215 
|
|align=center|2
|align=center|0:25
|Edmonton, Alberta, Canada
|
|-
|Loss
|align=center|22–7
|Demetrious Johnson
|Submission (armbar)
|UFC on Fox: Johnson vs. Reis
|
|align=center|3
|align=center|4:49
|Kansas City, Missouri, United States
|
|-
|Win
|align=center|22–6
|Ulka Sasaki
|Decision (unanimous)
|UFC 208
|
|align=center|3
|align=center|5:00
|Brooklyn, New York, United States
|
|-
|Win
|align=center|21–6
|Hector Sandoval
|Submission (rear-naked choke)
|UFC 201 
|
|align=center|1
|align=center|1:49
|Atlanta, Georgia, United States
|
|-
|Win
|align=center|20–6
|Dustin Ortiz
|Decision (unanimous)
|UFC on Fox: Johnson vs. Bader
|
|align=center|3
|align=center|5:00
|Newark, New Jersey, United States
|
|-
|Loss
|align=center| 19–6
|Jussier Formiga
|Decision (unanimous)
|UFC Fight Night: Condit vs. Alves
|
|align=center|3
|align=center|5:00
|Goiânia, Brazil
|
|-
| Win
| align=center| 19–5
| Scott Jorgensen
| Submission (arm-triangle choke)
| UFC 179
| 
| align=center| 1
| align=center| 3:28
| Rio de Janeiro, Brazil
| 
|-
| Win
| align=center| 18–5
| Joby Sanchez
| Decision (unanimous)
| UFC Fight Night: Henderson vs. dos Anjos
| 
| align=center| 3
| align=center| 5:00
| Tulsa, Oklahoma, United States
| 
|-
| Loss
| align=center| 17–5
| Iuri Alcântara
| Decision (split)
| UFC Fight Night: Machida vs. Mousasi
| 
| align=center| 3
| align=center| 5:00
| Jaraguá do Sul, Brazil
| 
|-
| Win
| align=center| 17–4
| Ivan Menjivar
| Decision (unanimous)
| UFC 165
| 
| align=center| 3
| align=center| 5:00
| Toronto, Ontario, Canada
| 
|-
| Win
| align=center| 16–4
| Owen Roddy
| Submission (rear-naked choke)
| Cage Warriors: 50
| 
| align=center| 3
| align=center| 1:32
| Glasgow, Scotland
| 
|-
| Win
| align=center| 15–4
| Billy Vaughan
| Submission (arm-triangle choke)
| Matrix Fights 7
| 
| align=center| 1
| align=center| 3:28
| Philadelphia, Pennsylvania, United States 
| 
|-
| Win
| align=center| 14–4
| Cody Stevens
| Decision (unanimous)
| Matrix Fights 6
| 
| align=center| 3
| align=center| 5:00
| Philadelphia, Pennsylvania, United States 
| 
|-
| Win
| align=center| 13–4
| Bruno Menezes
| Submission (rear-naked choke)
| WFE 11 - Platinum
| 
| align=center| 1
| align=center| 3:20
| Salvador, Brazil
| 
|-
| Loss
| align=center| 12–4
| Eduardo Dantas
| KO (flying knee and punches)
| Bellator 51
| 
| align=center| 2
| align=center| 1:02
| Canton, Ohio, United States
| 
|-
| Loss
| align=center| 12–3
| Patricio Freire
| KO (punches)
| Bellator 41
| 
| align=center| 3
| align=center| 3:29
| Yuma, Arizona, United States
| 
|-
| Win
| align=center| 12–2
| Zac George
| Submission (rear-naked choke)
| Bellator 37
| 
| align=center| 1
| align=center| 2:09
| Concho, Oklahoma, United States
| 
|-
| Win
| align=center| 11–2
| Deividas Taurosevicius
| Decision (split)
| Bellator 33
| 
| align=center| 3
| align=center| 5:00
| Philadelphia, Pennsylvania, United States
| 
|-
| Loss
| align=center| 10–2
| Patricio Freire
| Decision (unanimous)
| Bellator 18
| 
| align=center| 3
| align=center| 5:00
| Monroe, Louisiana, United States
| 
|-
| Win
| align=center| 10–1
| Shad Lierley
| Submission (rear-naked choke)
| Bellator 14
| 
| align=center| 3
| align=center| 3:33
| Hollywood, Florida, United States
| 
|-
| Win
| align=center| 9–1
| Dwayne Shelton
| Decision (unanimous)
| Locked in the Cage 1
| 
| align=center| 3
| align=center| 5:00
| Philadelphia, Pennsylvania, United States
| 
|-
| Win
| align=center| 8–1
| Roberto Vargas
| Decision (split)
| Bellator 10
| 
| align=center| 3
| align=center| 5:00
| Ontario, California, United States
| 
|-
| Loss
| align=center| 7–1
| Joe Soto
| Decision (unanimous)
| Bellator 6
| 
| align=center| 3
| align=center| 5:00
| Robstown, Texas, United States
| 
|-
| Win
| align=center| 7–0
| Henry Martinez
| Decision (unanimous)
| Bellator 2
| 
| align=center| 3
| align=center| 5:00
| Uncasville, Connecticut, United States
| 
|-
| Win
| align=center| 6–0
| Abel Cullum
| Decision (unanimous)
| ShoXC: Elite Challenger Series
| 
| align=center| 5
| align=center| 5:00
| Santa Ynez, California, United States
| 
|-
| Win
| align=center| 5–0
| Bryan Caraway
| Decision (unanimous)
| EliteXC: Unfinished Business
| 
| align=center| 3
| align=center| 5:00
| Stockton, California, United States
| 
|-
| Win
| align=center| 4–0
| Justin Robbins
| Submission (rear-naked choke)
| EliteXC: Primetime
| 
| align=center| 1
| align=center| 4:06
| Newark, New Jersey, United States
| 
|-
| Win
| align=center| 3–0
| Zach Makovsky
| Submission (arm-triangle choke)
| ShoXC: Elite Challenger Series
| 
| align=center| 2
| align=center| 1:15
| Atlantic City, New Jersey, United States
| 
|-
| Win
| align=center| 2–0
| Diego Jimenez
| Submission (rear-naked choke)
| CITC: Fearless Fighters Return
| 
| align=center| 1
| align=center| 2:00
| Trenton, New Jersey, United States
| 
|-
| Win
| align=center| 1–0
| Baba Shigeyasu
| Decision (unanimous)
| Extreme Challenge 81
| 
| align=center| 3
| align=center| 5:00
| West Orange, New Jersey, United States
|

See also
 List of current UFC fighters
 List of male mixed martial artists

References

External links
 
 

Living people
Brazilian male mixed martial artists
Bantamweight mixed martial artists
Featherweight mixed martial artists
Mixed martial artists utilizing boxing
Mixed martial artists utilizing Brazilian jiu-jitsu
Brazilian practitioners of Brazilian jiu-jitsu
People awarded a black belt in Brazilian jiu-jitsu
Brazilian expatriate sportspeople in the United States
1985 births
Sportspeople from Minas Gerais
Ultimate Fighting Championship male fighters